William Tate was an American Negro league pitcher in the 1910s.

Tate played for the Philadelphia Giants in 1915 and 1917. In three recorded career appearances on the mound, he posted a 4.70 ERA over 7.2 innings.

References

External links
Baseball statistics and player information from Baseball-Reference Black Baseball Stats and Seamheads

Year of birth missing
Year of death missing
Place of birth missing
Place of death missing
Philadelphia Giants players
Baseball pitchers